Macroglossum dohertyi is a moth of the  family Sphingidae. It is known from Queensland and Papua New Guinea.

This species is distinguished from other Macroglossum species by the presence on the forewing upperside of two narrow, sharply defined, buffish-white bands in the place of the space between the median lines and the grey postdiscal line. The forewings are brown and the hindwings are dark yellow with a broad brown margin.

Subspecies
Macroglossum dohertyi dohertyi
Macroglossum dohertyi doddi Clark, 1922 (Papua New Guinea)

References

Macroglossum
Moths described in 1894